The Hawaiian word lauwiliwilinukunukuʻoiʻoi refers to both of the following fish:

 Forcipiger flavissimus (Forcepsfish, aka Yellow Longnose Butterflyfish)
 Forcipiger longirostris (Longnose Butterflyfish)